Exclaimer is a privately held UK-based information technology company owned by Insight Partners. It develops, sells and provides support for a suite of email utilities and cloud computing technologies designed for adding disclaimers, branding, and regulatory compliance for corporate email via personalized email signatures. Its products are designed to work with Microsoft Exchange Server, Office 365 and Google Workspace. The company's headquarters is located in Farnborough, United Kingdom.

The company name, "Exclaimer", comes from a combination of "Exchange" and "disclaimer".

History
The company was founded in 2001 by Andrew Millington and Christopher Crawshay. Exclaimer became an incorporated company in October 2003.

The first Exclaimer products allowed organizations to apply legally compliant disclaimers to corporate email sent by Microsoft Exchange Server and Microsoft Outlook. These were later enhanced to allow for more complex HTML to ensure consistent corporate branding.

On 6 December 2016, Livingbridge invested £23 million in Exclaimer. The investment was advised by PricewaterhouseCoopers and was the last primary investment from Livingbridge 5, the firm's £360m fund raised in 2012.

In 2020, Exclaimer appointed Heath Davies, as CEO.

On 7 December 2020, Insight Partners took a majority stake in Exclaimer, investing over $133 million with participation from Farview Equity Partners and existing investor Livingbridge.

On 9 February 2021, Exclaimer completed the acquisition of Customer Thermometer, a customer satisfaction survey platform.

On 11 October 2021, Exclaimer appointed Marco Costa as its new chief executive following Heath Davies standing down.

On 21 January 2022, Exclaimer acquired appointment scheduling software provider, Periodic.

Company
Exclaimer is a Microsoft Gold Certified Partner and a Google Cloud Partner. The company was named in The Sunday Times WorldFirst SME Export Track 100 of the UK's small and medium-sized private companies with the fastest-growing international sales. 

It was also named in the Financial Times FT 1000: Europe's Fastest Growing Companies that lists the European companies that achieve the highest compound growth rate.

The company has a number of international offices, including regional headquarters for the Americas in Miami, United States, and for Europe in Hoorn, Netherlands.

References

External links

Software companies of the United Kingdom
Business software companies
Email
Software companies established in 2001
2001 establishments in the United Kingdom
2001 establishments in England
Companies based in Hampshire
Companies based in Farnborough
Companies established in 2001